The Jewel is a 2011 Italian drama film directed by Andrea Molaioli. The film was mainly shot in Acqui Terme and its surroundings, including the ancient palace former seat of the Court, and in Turin. Other shots were taken in New York, Moscow-Russia.

Cast
 Toni Servillo as Ernesto Botta
 Remo Girone as Amanzio Rastelli
 Sarah Felberbaum as Laura Aliprandi
 Fausto Maria Sciarappa as Franco Schianchi
 Lino Guanciale as Filippo Magnaghi
 Vanessa Compagnucci as Barbara Magnaghi
 Lisa Galantini as Segretaria
 Renato Carpentieri as Crusco
 Gianna Paola Scaffidi as Augusta Rastelli
 Maurizio Marchetti as Giulio Fontana
 Igor Chernevich as Igor Yashenko
 Jay O. Sanders as Mr. Rothman

See also
 Parmalat bankruptcy

References

External links
 

2011 films
2011 drama films
2010s Italian-language films
Films about businesspeople
Italian drama films
2010s Italian films